Cafagna is a surname. Notable people with the surname include:

 Diego Cafagna (born 1975), race walker
 Marcus Cafagna (born 1956), poet and professor
 Mickey Cafagna (1943–2009), politician

See also
 Ashley Tesoro (born 1983), actress; born Ashley Lyn Cafagna

Italian-language surnames